Francis Joseph Sheed (20 March 1897 in Sydney – 20 November 1981 in Jersey City) was an Australian-born lawyer, Catholic writer, publisher, speaker, and lay theologian. He and his wife Maisie Ward were famous in their day as the names behind the imprint Sheed & Ward and as forceful public lecturers in the Catholic Evidence Guild.

Life and career

Early life
Sheed was born in Sydney on 20 March 1897 to John Sheed, a descendant of Scottish Presbyterians, and English-born Mary Maloney. His mother's family were Irish Catholic. Baptized Catholic, at the insistence of their father, Frank Sheed and his brother Jack were raised Protestant. Frank would attend the Methodist Church, and surreptitiously make his Catholic First Communion and Confirmation. He attended Sydney Boys’ High School and in 1917 obtained a BA degree from the University of Sydney.

Catholic Evidence Guild
In 1920, Sheed travelled to London, where he encountered the Catholic Evidence Guild whose lay Catholics expounded the faith. He joined the group and became an effective soapbox orator. With an understanding of Protestant attitudes toward Catholicism, Sheed took up writing and speaking on the subject of Catholic apologetics, the rational defense of the Catholic faith. Through his activity with the Guild he met Maisie Ward, daughter of Wilfrid Ward, a prominent Catholic essayist and biographer.

Sheed & Ward
Sheed and Maisie Ward were married in April 1926. That same year, they moved to London, where Sheed and Maisie's brother Leo established the publishing house of Sheed and Ward. When Leo Ward left to become a priest, Maisie took his place as publisher. Their son Wilfred Sheed was an essayist and novelist; their daughter, Rosemary, a translator.

As publisher of an all-star roster including Karl Adam, Hilaire Belloc, G. K. Chesterton, Christopher Dawson, Ida Friederike Görres, Ronald Knox, Hugh Pope, and Evelyn Waugh, Sheed maintained a robust Catholic faith while keeping abreast of progressive trends. Frank Sheed wrote a constant stream of books touching on almost every aspect of basic theology, several of which remain in print. His translation of St. Augustine's Confessions remains acclaimed.
In 1933 they opened a branch in New York and became "the most influential Catholic publishers in the English-speaking world".

In 1956 Lille Catholic University awarded him a doctorate in divinity. They sold the firm in 1973.  He published an autobiography, The Church and I (1974). Frank Sheed died on 20 November 1981 at Jersey City and was buried in the Holy Name cemetery.

Works 
The Catholic Evidence Guild (1925)
A Map of Life (1933)
Theology and Sanity (1947)
Communism and Man (1945)
Theology for Beginners (1957)
To Know Christ Jesus
Nullity of Marriage
What Difference Does Jesus Make (1970)
Marriage and the Family
The Church and I [autobiography], Garden City, NY:  Doubleday, (1974).
Saints are Not Sad (1949)
Society and Sanity, Sheed & Ward, 1953.
Christ In Eclipse,  Sheed Andrews and McMeel, Inc.  Kansas City, (1978)

Bibliography
 Frank Sheed (1974), The Church & I, Doubleday.
 Maisie Ward (1963), Unfinished Business, New York:  Sheed & Ward.  
 Maisie Ward (1973), To and Fro on the Earth:  A Sequel to an Autobiography, New York:  Sheed & Ward.
 Wilfrid Sheed (1985), Frank and Maisie:  A Memoir with Parents, New York:  Simon & Schuster.
 David Meconi (2011), Introductory Essay in Frank Sheed and Maisie Ward: Spiritual writings, Maryknoll:  Orbis Books.

References 

Roman Catholic writers
1897 births
1981 deaths
Lay theologians
Writers from Sydney